Sevagan is a 1992 Indian Tamil-language crime film directed and produced by Arjun Sarja, making his directorial debut. The film stars him and Khushbu. It was released on 5 June 1992, and fared well at box office.

Plot 

Sanjay, a fearless and upright police officer, is transferred to a new city. He lives with his widowed mother and sister. He also has a half-brother Ashok and stepmother. Ashok works for the corrupted minister Sabapathy, who is involved in liquor smuggling, procuring, and illegal gambling. One day, a corrupt police officer Sridhar tries to rape an innocent girl Anjali. Sanjay arrives on time, saves Anjali, and beats Sridhar. Sanjay later marries Anjali. He strongly supports the politician Sathyamoorthy. Sabapathy decides to target Sanjay's weak point: his wife Anjali. What transpires later forms the crux of the story.

Cast 

Arjun Sarja as D.S.P Sanjay
Khushbu as Anjali
Captain Raju as Sabapathy
Nassar as Ashok
Rocky as Dhoni/Singh
Vennira Aadai Moorthy as Ekambaram
Senthil as Kanakambaram
Charuhasan as Sathyamoorthy
Ra. Sankaran as Shanmugam, Anjali's mother
MRK as Arumugam
Kavitha as Sanjay's mother
C. R. Saraswathi as Ashok's mother
Ravichandran in a guest appearance
Major Sundarrajan in a guest appearance

Production 
Sevagan is the directorial debut of Arjun. As his acting career was floundering and he stopped receiving offers from directors, he himself decided to direct, produce and star in a film which became Sevagan.

Soundtrack 
The music was composed by Maragadha Mani, with lyrics written by Vairamuthu.

Release and reception 
Sevagan was released on 5 June 1992. RSP of The Indian Express gave the film a mixed review, citing "the narration lacks depth [...] Kushboo has been wasted. Captain Raju fails to impress only the first song bears Maragadha Mani's stamp" and praised the stunt sequences. The film was a success, and revitalised Arjun's career.

References

External links 
 

1990s Tamil-language films
1992 crime films
1992 directorial debut films
1992 films
Fictional portrayals of the Tamil Nadu Police
Films directed by Arjun Sarja
Films scored by M. M. Keeravani
Indian crime films